Faqih Soleyman (also Romanized as Faqīh Soleymān; also known as Faq-i-Sulaimān) is a village in Avalan Rural District, Muchesh District, Kamyaran County, Kurdistan Province, Iran. At the 2006 census, its population was 41, in 8 families. The village is populated by Kurds.

References 

Towns and villages in Kamyaran County
Kurdish settlements in Kurdistan Province